Bazhergah (also Romanized as Bāzhergah; also known as Bājergeh) is a village in Sumay-ye Shomali Rural District, Sumay-ye Beradust District, Urmia County, West Azerbaijan Province, Iran. At the 2006 census, its population was 115, in 16 families.

References 

Populated places in Urmia County